The 2017 Telus Cup was Canada's 39th annual national midget 'AAA' hockey championship,  contested April 24 – 30, 2017 at the CN Centre in Prince George, British Columbia.  The Cape Breton West Islanders defeated the Blizzard du Séminaire Saint-François 5-4 in overtime to win the gold medal, becoming the first team from Atlantic Canada to win a national midget championship.

Teams

Round robin

Tiebreaker: Head-to-head record, most wins, highest goal differential.

Playoffs

Individual awards
Most Valuable Player: Jacob Hudson (Cape Breton)
Top Scorer: Maxime Collin (Séminaire Saint-François)
Top Forward: Dillon Hamaliuk (Leduc)
Top Defensive Player: Jeremy Gervais (Cariboo)
Top Goaltender: Christian Purboo (Mississauga)
Most Sportsmanlike Player: Maxime Collin (Séminaire Saint-François)
Esso Scholarship: Dylan MacDonald (Cape Breton)

Road to the Telus Cup

Atlantic Region
Cape Breton West Islanders advance by winning tournament played March 30–April 2, 2017 in Miramichi, New Brunswick.

Québec
Blizzard du Séminaire Saint-François advance by winning Quebec Midget AAA Hockey League championship series.

Central Region
Mississauga Rebels advance by winning tournament played March 26–April 2, 2016 in Sudbury, Ontario.

West Region
Regina Pat Canadians advance by winning tournament played March 30–April 2, 2017 at the T.G. Smith Centre in Steinbach, Manitoba.

Pacific Region
Series not played: Leduc Oil Kings advance automatically as Cariboo Cougars are the national host team.

See also
Telus Cup

References

External links
2017 Telus Cup Home Page
Midget AAA Canada Website
Midget AAA Telus Cup Regional Championship Website

Telus Cup
Telus Cup 2017
Telus Cup 2017
Telus Cup
April 2017 sports events in Canada